The Rule of Law in Armed Conflicts Project (RULAC Project) is an initiative of the Geneva Academy of International Humanitarian Law and Human Rights to support the application and implementation of the international law of armed conflict.

Overview
Through a global database and analysis, the RULAC Project has as its aim an assessment of the implementation by states of the law applicable in armed conflicts: 
international humanitarian law 
international human rights law
international criminal law
refugee law

The project will ultimately cover all member states of the United Nations and parties to the Geneva Conventions as well as contested territories, whether they are in situation of armed conflict or not. Indeed, certain international rules must be implemented during peacetime or are relevant in post-conflict situations, in particular those relating to the repression of international crimes. In addition, the rules regarding the fight against terrorism, also to be covered by the website, are applicable to states that are not necessarily in a situation of armed conflict.

The website is divided into three parts. The homepage offers a small description of the applicable law and addresses the main legal issues in that area, for example the legal qualification of conflicts or the applicability of international law to non-state armed groups. The website then offers for each country the relevant texts and documents dealing with the national and international legal framework (national legislation and case law, resolutions of intergovernmental organizations, treaty, etc.). Finally, the website offers a legal analysis that, on one hand, qualifies the conflict under international humanitarian law and on the other hand, determines the applicable law. This part of the website, certainly the most delicate in juridical and political terms, is particular to the RULAC Project.

The RULAC Project should prove to be a precious source of information for government officials, journalists and more widely for any person interested by the respect of the law in war.

Geneva Conventions
The first three Geneva Conventions were revised, expanded, and replaced, and the fourth one was added, in 1949.

 The Geneva Convention for the Amelioration of the Condition of the Wounded and Sick in Armed Forces in the Field was adopted in 1864. It was significantly revised and replaced by the 1906 version, the 1929 version, and later the First Geneva Convention of 1949.
 The Geneva Convention for the Amelioration of the Condition of Wounded, Sick and Shipwrecked Members of Armed Forces at Sea was adopted in 1906. It was significantly revised and replaced by the Second Geneva Convention of 1949.
 The Geneva Convention relative to the Treatment of Prisoners of War was adopted in 1929. It was significantly revised and replaced by the Third Geneva Convention of 1949.
 The Fourth Geneva Convention relative to the Protection of Civilian Persons in Time of War was adopted in 1949.

In addition, there are three additional amendment protocols to the Geneva Convention:
 Protocol I (1977): Protocol Additional to the Geneva Conventions of 12 August 1949, and relating to the Protection of Victims of International Armed Conflicts. As of 12 January 2007 it had been ratified by 167 countries.
 Protocol II (1977): Protocol Additional to the Geneva Conventions of 12 August 1949, and relating to the Protection of Victims of Non-International Armed Conflicts. As of 12 January 2007 it had been ratified by 163 countries.
 Protocol III (2005): Protocol Additional to the Geneva Conventions of 12 August 1949, and relating to the Adoption of an Additional Distinctive Emblem. As of June 2007 it had been ratified by 17 countries and signed but not yet ratified by an additional 68 countries.

ICRC, What is International Humanitarian Law?, Fact Sheet, 2004.

ICRC, Basic Rules of the 1949 Geneva Conventions and 1977 Additional Protocols, 1988

ICRC, study of customary international humanitarian law.

See also

 Combatant
 Crime against humanity
 Customary international law
 Disarmed Enemy Forces
 Genocide
 Human rights
 International human rights instruments
 Just War
 Prisoner-of-war camp
 Prisoner of war
 Protective sign
 Roerich’s Pact
 Rule of law
 Rule According to Higher Law
 Total war
 War crime

Further reading
Barenboim P.,Sidiqi N., "Bruges, the Bridge between Civilizations: 75 Anniversary of Roerich Pact", Grid Belgium, 2010, 
Bassiouni, M.C., Introduction to International Criminal Law, Transnational Publishers, 2003
Cassese A., Gaeta P. and Jones J.R.W.D. (eds), The Rome Statute of the International Criminal Court: A Commentary, Oxford University Press, 2002. 
Cassese, A., International Law, Oxford University Press, UK, 2005.
Cassese, A., International Criminal Law, Oxford University Press, 2nd edition, 2008.
Clapham, A., Human Rights: A Very Short Introduction, Oxford University Press, UK, 2007
Cryer, R., Friman, H., Robinson, D., and Wilmshurst, E., An Introduction to International Criminal Law and Procedure, Cambridge University Press, 2007.
De Greiff, P. (ed.), The Handbook on Reparations, Oxford University Press, 2006. 
Deng, F.M., “The Global Challenge of Internal Displacement”, Journal of Law and Policy, Vol. 5, 2001.
Feller, E., Türk, V. and Nicholson, F. (eds.), Refugee Protection in International Law, UNHCR‘s Global Consultations on International Protection, Cambridge, University Press, 2003.
Goodwin-Gill, G.S. and McAdam, J., The Refugee in International Law, 3rd edition, Oxford University Press, 2007.
Hathaway J.C., The Rights of Refugees under International Law, Cambridge University Press, Cambridge, 2005.
Kälin, W., Müller, L. and Wyttenbach, J., The Face of Human Rights, Lars Müller Publishing, Germany, 2004.
Romano, C., Nollkaemper, A., Kleffner, J., (eds), Internationalized Criminal Courts and Tribunals: Sierra Leone, East Timor, Kosovo and Cambodia, Oxford University Press, 2004. 
Schabas, W.A., The UN International Criminal Tribunals. The former Yugoslavia, Rwanda and Sierra Leone, Cambridge University Press, 2006.
Smith, R.K.M. and van den Anker, C.(eds.), The Essentials of Human Rights, Oxford University Press, UK, 2006. 
Steiner, H.J., Alston, P., and Goodman, R., International Human Rights in Context: Laws, Politics and Morals, 3rd edition, Oxford University Press, UK, 2008. 
Teitel, R.G., Transitional Justice, Oxford University Press, 2000. 
Tomuschat, C., Human Rights: Between Idealism and Realism, 2nd edition, Oxford University Press, UK, 2008.
UNHCR, Handbook on Criteria and Procedures Determining the Status of Refugees, Geneva, 1979.
Zahar, A. & Sluiter, G., International Criminal Law, Oxford University Press, 2008.

References

External links
Geneva Academy of International Humanitarian Law and Human Rights
International Committee of the Red Cross (ICRC)
Official United Nations website
Official UN website on Human Rights
Official UN website on International Law
Official website of the International Court of Justice
UNHCHR
Representative of the Secretary-General on the human rights of internally displaced persons (Walter Kälin).

Aftermath of war
Human rights instruments
Human rights
International law